Aspergillus cavernicola (also named A. amylovorus) is a species of fungus in the genus Aspergillus. It is from the Cavernicolus section. The species was first described in 1969. It has been isolated from the wall of a cave in Romania and from wheat starch in Ukraine.

Growth and morphology

A. cavernicola has been cultivated on both Czapek yeast extract agar (CYA) plates and Malt Extract Agar Oxoid® (MEAOX) plates. The growth morphology of the colonies can be seen in the pictures below.

References 

cavernicola
Fungi described in 1969